Carmen Sue Forest (born April 21, 1955 in Stillwater, Oklahoma) is an American former handball player who competed in the 1984 Summer Olympics.

References

1955 births
Living people
People from Stillwater, Oklahoma
American female handball players
Olympic handball players of the United States
Handball players at the 1984 Summer Olympics
21st-century American women